Pseudoclanis axis is a moth of the  family Sphingidae. It is known from Cameroon.

References

Pseudoclanis
Moths described in 1993